Scared Straight! is a 1978 documentary film and a type of juvenile rehabilitation program named for it.

Scared Straight may also refer to:

Scared Straight (band), an American punk band, now known as Ten Foot Pole 
Scared Straight (album), a 1996 album by New Bomb Turks
"Scared Straight", a 2003 song by the Long Winters from When I Pretend to Fall
"Scared Straight" (Beavis and Butt-Head), a 1993 television episode
"Scared Straight" (Saturday Night Live), a recurring sketch on Saturday Night Live

See also
Scared Stiff (disambiguation)